The 16th Vietnam Film Festival was held from December 8 to December 12, 2009 in Ho Chi Minh City, Vietnam, with the slogan "For a reformed and integrated Vietnam cinema" (Vietnamese: "Vì một nền điện ảnh Việt Nam đổi mới và hội nhập").

Event 
The 16th Vietnam Film Festival is also a meaningful "reunion" with the public in Ho Chi Minh City since the 5th Vietnam Film Festival was held in 1983 in the city named after Uncle Ho. 2009 is also the 50th anniversary of the Vietnamese Revolutionary Cinema, so this is also a festival for Vietnam's Cinema to review its development journey with significant successes achieved in the region and the world.

The opening ceremony of the Film Festival took place on the evening of December 8 at White Palace, broadcast live on HTV7 channel. The closing ceremony on the evening of December 12 at Hòa Bình Theater, live on HTV9 channel.

Public opinion praises this film festival for being more professional in a number of stages: Organizing the voting for the most favorite movies of the audience, and seminars. Professionally, the 16th Vietnam Film Festival also impressed with the "double" of the Golden Lotus and the director award for the film "Đừng đốt" by director Đặng Nhật Minh.

Participation 
This year, the organizers extend to a maximum of 100% of feature films of all types (feature, documentary, science, animated) of all cinema establishments, produced after the 15th Vietnam Film Festival (November 2007) to the second half of October 2009, all were able to participate. This is intended to encourage movie establishments to produce more movies in theaters, to serve the public. Therefore, some studios send up to two or three films to participate. Fifteen works with three film lines: State, private and films by overseas Vietnamese directors created a colorful cinematic picture. The difference in quantity between public and private films is not significant.

Participating in the competition at the 16th Vietnam Film Festival, there were 99 cinematographic works from 29 film production facilities across the country. In which, there are 15 feature films, 11 direct-to-video feature films, 20 animated films and 53 documentaries - science films. 9 foreign film troupes from China, Japan, Korea, the US, Finland, Russia, Singapore, Laos and Cambodia have attended and contribute ideas in seminars on short films, on mobilizing capital for film production. This clearly shows the integration efforts of the country's cinema.

Jury 
The organizers clearly define each film genre to have the best movie among the entries, so each film genre has won the Golden Lotus award: "Đừng đốt" (Feature film), "13 bến nước" (Direct-to-video Feature film), "Đất lạnh" (Documentary), "Nước ngầm cảnh báo" (Science film) and "Thỏ và Rùa" (Animated film).

The feature film jury comprises 9 members: President of Vietnam Cinema Association Trần Luân Kim (Head), director Vũ Xuân Hưng, painter Phạm Quang Vĩnh, director Bùi Tuấn Dũng, composer Đặng Hữu Phúc, screenwriters Chu Lai and Văn Lê, cinematographer Hoàng Tấn Phát, actress Ngọc Hiệp. Direct-to-video feature film jury has 7 members, led by director Xuân Sơn. Documentary - science film jury has 7 members, led by director Lò Minh. The animated film jury has 5 members and is headed by director Đặng Hiền. For the first time at the National Film Festival, there will also be a press panel led by Trịnh Lê Văn - Head of the Department of Arts and Sciences of Vietnam Television.

This year, in addition to the traditional awards of the Film Festival, the organizers added the award category for the best feature film voted by the press into the award structure. This award is organized by the organizers in collaboration with the Press Department - Ministry of Information and Communications. Each judging journalist was given a briefcase containing information about the 15 films participating in the festival, the judging rules, paper for making comments, a pen and a flashlight (for viewing seats and reading documents).

The film festival continued to maintain the audience vote award, although this award is still considered inaccurate, as the film that wins is often the most free-to-view film, not the best film in the opinion of the public. majority of the public. The award voted by the audience in this festival is recommended to use the form of ticket sales or online voting.

Activities 
Movies are shown according to schedule at cinemas in Ho Chi Minh City: Thăng Long A, Đại Đồng, Đống Đa, Galaxy Nguyễn Du, Fafilm. The film "14 ngày phép" is the opening film for the cinema screenings at Thăng Long A theater from 9:30 a.m. on December 7. At the same time, at the cinemas of Fafilm, Đống Đa and Đại Đồng will also screen films submitted to the festival in the genres of direct-to-video feature, documentary - science and animated. The movies will be shown until the end of December 11 in 3 mornings, afternoons and evenings. 

On the morning of December 8, movie artists came to offer flowers at Uncle Hồ's monument and at the same time the Film Fair will open at the Cultural Center of District 10. For the first time at the National Film Festival, the Film Fair activity was officially held with the name "Cinema with the Public" (Vietnamese: Điện ảnh với công chúng), paralleling almost the entire duration of the festival. This is a remarkable innovation because at film festivals around the world, and even big art festivals like Cannes, there are also film fairs. The public will have access to filmmakers and producers.

For Vietnamese and international professionals and film professionals, there are 3 seminars and talks on:
"Short films in the context of international integration" (Vietnamese: "Phim ngắn trong bối cảnh hội nhập quốc tế")
"Building projects and raising capital for film production" (Vietnamese: "Xây dựng dự án và huy động vốn sản xuất phim")
"Introducing filmmaking with HD technology and mobile film projection" (Vietnamese: "Giới thiệu làm phim công nghệ HD và công tác chiếu phim lưu động")

Inadequacy 
This Vietnam Film Festival does not have a festival space with a large square for flags to fly, for the public to meet and interact with artists. Artist Quyen Linh expressed regret that he did not have the opportunity to interact with the public on the opening night because the audience was separated by barriers from the artist. The opening night space of the festival is confined to the premises of the White Place convention center, a convention center with limited height, causing the images to be miniaturized, torn apart within the low wall and lost impression.

Because the stage space is too small to match the scale of the festival, the opening dance performance in the opening ceremony was staged very elaborately and colorfully, but still had the appearance of a performance. fashion. The catwalk nature of the opening night stage of the film festival was enhanced when the girls, who were mostly models, appeared in a few dramas and walked around the stage as emerging movie actors, making viewers think of beauty contests.

Even when the closing ceremony and awarding ceremony are held in a more spacious and airy space than Hoa Binh theater, artists are not properly honored, even award winners are herded to sit on guard, it was very inconvenient to get on stage when his name was called.

Official Selection

Feature film 

Highlighted title indicates Golden Lotus winner.

Awards

Feature film

Direct-to-video

Documentary/Science film

Documentary film

Science film

Animated film

References 

Vietnam Film Festival
Vietnam Film Festival
Vietnam Film Festival
2009 in Vietnam